Asura undulosa is a moth of the family Erebidae first described by Francis Walker in 1854. It is found in the north-western Himalayas, Sikkim, Bhutan and Myanmar.

References

undulosa
Moths described in 1854
Moths of Asia